Nepidermin, also known as recombinant human epidermal growth factor (rhEGF), is a recombinant form of human epidermal growth factor (EGF) and a cicatrizant (a drug that promotes wound healing through formation of scar tissue).  As a recombinant form of EGF, nepidermin is an agonist of the epidermal growth factor receptor (EGFR), and is the first EGFR agonist to be marketed.  It was developed by Cuban Center for Genetic Engineering and Biotechnology (CIBG), and has been marketed by Heber Biotech as an intralesional injection for diabetic foot ulcer under the trade name Heberprot‐P since 2006.  As of 2016, Heberprot‐P had been marketed in 23 countries, but remains unavailable in the United States.  In 2015, preparations were made to conduct the Phase III trials required for FDA approval, however as of 2023 developments in U.S.-Cuba relations have stymied importation of the drug from Cuba.    

A topical spray formulation has been developed under the brand Easyef by Daewoong Pharmaceutical.   It is marketed as an ointment for the treatment of diabetic foot ulcers, wounds, and alopecia (hair loss) in Vietnam, the Philippines, Thailand, and China.  A Daewoong-funded Phase II study evaluating nepidermin oral spray for chemotherapy-induced oral mucositis did not reduce incidence or duration of moderate or severe oral mucositis, however per-protocol analysis suggested nepidermin oral spray might reduce pain associated with oral mucositis.

See also 
 Becaplermin
 Murodermin

References 

Growth factors
Hair loss medications
Human proteins
Recombinant proteins